The Manson crater is an impact crater near the site of Manson, Iowa where an asteroid or comet nucleus struck the Earth during the Cretaceous Period, approximately 74 Ma. It was one of the largest known impact events to have happened in North America. Previously it was thought to have led to the extinction of the dinosaurs until isotopic ages proved that it was too old.

Description 

No surface evidence exists due to comparatively recent coverage by glacial till, and the site where the crater lies buried is now a flat landscape. It lies under the southeast corner of Pocahontas County and extends under portions of three adjoining counties. That an anomalous structure underlaid the area was known from unusual water well drill cuttings in 1912 of deformed rock,  "crystalline clast breccia with a melt matrix" as a later report described it. A research investigation was started in 1955, and it was labeled a "cryptovolcanic structure" (a hypothetical volcanic steam explosion). Further investigation was undertaken by Robert S. Dietz who proposed an impact origin in 1959 and by Nicholas Short in 1966 who produced evidence of shocked quartz grains which confirmed the impact origin of the structure.

In 1991 and 1992 the U.S. Geological Survey along with others including the Iowa Geological Survey conducted detailed research in part to test the possible connection of the Manson Crater with the Cretaceous–Paleogene extinction event. The / isotope ratio dating of the core from the impact structure gave an age of about 74 Ma, or about 10 Ma older than the K–T boundary.

The site at the time was the shore of a shallow inland sea, the Western Interior Seaway. The impact disrupted granite, gneiss, and shales of the Precambrian basement as well as sedimentary formations of Paleozoic age, Devonian through Cretaceous. Limestone layers that give the rest of Iowa hard water were instantaneously vaporized down to the basement rocks, giving Manson the anomalous soft water that it has today.

References

Bibliography 
 Christian Koeberl and Raymond R. Anderson, eds; 1996, The Manson Impact Structure, Iowa: Anatomy of an Impact Crater, Geological Society of America Special Paper 302,

Further reading 
 Raymond R. Anderson, 1999, Iowa's Manson Impact Structure, Iowa DNR
 Additional material from Iowa DNR with image links
 Detailed illustrated time sequence of the Manson impact event from NASA

External links 
 Aerial Exploration of the Manson Impact Structure

Impact craters of the United States
Cretaceous impact craters
Cretaceous United States
Campanian Stage
Geology of Iowa
Landforms of Pocahontas County, Iowa
Landforms of Iowa